Condado Beach (Spanish: Playa del Condado) is a large public-access beach located in El Condado, a district of Santurce in San Juan, Puerto Rico. It is considered a dangerous beach with strong undercurrents.

Description 
Condado Beach is located along the Atlantic coast of the San Juan barrio (district) of Santurce. The beach is named after Condado, itself a constituting subbarrio (sector) of Santurce, found directly to the east of the Islet of San Juan. The beach itself extends from La Ventana al Mar Park on Ashford Avenue in the west to Punta Piedrita in the east. Ocean Park Beach is located further east. A smaller beach, called Playita del Condado (Spanish for "Condado's small beach"), is located at the western edge of Condado, directly facing El Boquerón. The beach is dangerous for swimmers and in early 2022 the governor stated steps had to be taken to address the issue of multiple drownings there.

Nearby locations 
Condado Beach is located in a prime area for tourism and recreation. The beach is bordered by renown casinos and hotels such as La Concha Resort, the San Juan Marriott, and the historic Vanderbilt Hotel. Ashford Avenue, often referred to as the Puerto Rican “Fifth Avenue”, hosts world-renowned brands such as Cartier, Louis Vuitton, Gucci and Salvatore Ferragamo, and Puerto Rican brands and high-end boutiques such as Nono Maldonado, Lisa Thon, Harry Robles and Ecliptica. The area also has numerous restaurants of different varieties, gift shops, and smaller inns. The part of the beach found at the end of Vendig Street is considered a popular gay neighborhood of El Condado.

Gallery

See also 
 List of beaches in Puerto Rico

References 

Beaches of Puerto Rico
Tourist attractions in San Juan, Puerto Rico